Thorsten Laewe is a composer. He is also known for his work as a recording and mixing engineer and co-owner of Laboratory Audio, a sample-library and sound-design company.

Filmography

Trailers (as Composer) 
 Billions 
 Avengers Age of Ultron
 Sicario
 Ant-Man
 Pirates of the Caribbean
 Deja Vu
 Mortal Kombat 2015
 Tom Clancy's Rainbow Six 2015
 Tim Burton's Corpse Bride
 The Astronaut Farmer
 The Return
 Breach
 Not Another Teen movie

Music Library Work 
 Warner / Chappell Production Music
 Westone
 Liquid Cinema
 APM
 Universal Music

Certified Gold/Platinum Records (as Mix-Engineer, Recording-Engineer)

Records
 Christina Aguilera "You Lost Me" Radiomix (Hex Hector & Mac Quayle)
 Luther Vandross "Dance With My Father" [Certified: Platinum]
 Brandy "FullMoon" [Certified: Platinum]
 SISQO "Return of Dragon" [Certified: Platinum]
 Montel Jordan "Montel Jordan"
 BeBe Winans "Live And Up Close"
 Michelle Williams "Heart to Yours"
 Mario "Mario" [Certified: Gold]
 Mary Mary "Incredible" [Certified: Gold]
 Deborah Cox "The Morning After"
 Dru Hill "Dru World Order" [Certified: Platinum]
 Kelly Price "Priceless" [Certified: Gold]
 Fred Hammond "Speak Those Things: POL Chapter 3"
 Yolanda Adams "Believe" [Certified: Gold]
 The Naked Brothers Band "The Naked Brothers Band"
 The Naked Brothers Band "I Don't Want to Go to School" (also Co-Producer)

Films and TV 

 Too Old To Die Young (Score Mixer)
 Hotel Artemis (Score Mixer)
 Game Night (Score Mixer)
 Den of Thieves (Score Mixer)
 The Foreigner (Score Mixer)
 Scream Queens (Main Title Mixer)
 Coughdrop (Score Recordist, Score Mixer)
 Vice (Score Recordist, Score Mixer)
 A Simple Spy (Score Mixer)
 Stuart Little 2 (Soundtrack Recordist)

External links

 Thor Laewe
 Laboratory Audio

American film score composers
American male film score composers
American television composers
Berklee College of Music alumni
German emigrants to the United States
Living people
Male television composers
Musicians from Los Angeles
Year of birth missing (living people)